Mohammad Ghossoun (born January 28, 1989) is a Syrian boxer, who competed in the heavyweight division (– 91 kg) at the 2010 Asian Games and won a gold medal.

Career 
At the 2009 Mediterranean Games he was defeated in the semi final by Italian star Clemente Russo and won the bronze medal.

At 2010 Asian Games he defeated:
Vasiliy Levit (Kazakhstan) 11-6
Jeon Chan-Yeong (South Korea)  10-1
Ali Mazaheri (Iran) 2-1
Manpreet Singh (India) 8-1 and won the gold medal

At the 2012 Asian Boxing Olympic Qualification Tournament he lost to old foe Mazaheri 11:14.

References

1989 births
Living people
Asian Games medalists in boxing
Boxers at the 2010 Asian Games
Boxers at the 2014 Asian Games
Syrian male boxers
Heavyweight boxers
Asian Games gold medalists for Syria
Mediterranean Games bronze medalists for Syria
Competitors at the 2009 Mediterranean Games
Medalists at the 2010 Asian Games
Mediterranean Games medalists in boxing